Juliane "Julia" Unterberger (born 5 September 1962) is an Italian lawyer and politician from South Tyrol.

Biography
Unterberger attended the Beda-Weber-Gymnasium in Merano and then studied at the University of Innsbruck. In 1987, she completed her studies in economics with a diploma thesis on economic statistics in South Tyrol, in 1992 successfully completing the law studies offered by the Universities of Innsbruck and Padua with a diploma thesis on the implementation of EC law in Italy. Professionally, she works as a lawyer specializing in family law in South Tyrol. From 1999 to 2008, she was President of the State Advisory Board for Equal Opportunities.

In the provincial elections in 2003, Unterberger was able to win a seat in the Landtag and thus also in the regional council on the list of the South Tyrolean People's Party. She narrowly missed re-election in the 2008 provincial elections. After Christian Egartner had to resign from the Landtag according to a judgment of the court of cassation, Unterberger moved up for him and was sworn in again as a member of parliament on 21 July 2010. On 2 March 2011, she was elected President of the Landtag to succeed Dieter Steger. According to the intended rotation principle at mid-term of the legislative period, she was replaced in this office by Mauro Minniti on 18 May, but remained as vice-president. Unterberger used her work in the Presidium of the Landtag to implement a new interpretation of the rules of procedure that the opposition parties had unsuccessfully fought against and which will prevent future obstruction. Before the state elections in 2013, she decided not to run again. In the parliamentary elections in 2018 she was elected into the Italian Senate with 61.1% of the votes in the single constituency of Merano.

Personal life
Unterberger lives in Merano, is married and has two children from her previous marriage to Karl Zeller.

References

1962 births
Living people
People from Merano
Italian women lawyers
Germanophone Italian people
South Tyrolean People's Party politicians
Members of the Landtag of South Tyrol
Members of the Regional Council of Trentino-Alto Adige
Senators of Legislature XVIII of Italy
University of Innsbruck alumni
University of Padua alumni
21st-century Italian women politicians
20th-century Italian lawyers
21st-century Italian lawyers
20th-century Italian women
Senators of Legislature XIX of Italy
Women members of the Senate of the Republic (Italy)